Kneip is a surname. Notable people with the surname include:

Christoph Kneip (born 1980), German épée fencer
Gustav Kneip (1905–1992), German composer and conductor
Richard F. Kneip (1933–1987), American politician and diplomat

See also
Kneip–Bredthauer House
Knipp (surname)
Occupational surnames